Edmund John Sieminski (October 20, 1932 – June 14, 2021) was a Republican member of the Pennsylvania House of Representatives.

Biography
Sieminski served in the Pennsylvania House of Representatives after being elected to serve a district that included the city of Easton in Northampton County, Pennsylvania. 

Sieminski entered politics after a distinguished career as an officer in the United States Army, retiring with a rank of lieutenant colonel. He was a decorated combat veteran, having served two tours in the Vietnam War. 

Sieminski graduated with a Bachelor of Science degree from the University of Scranton in 1955 and Master of Science degree from Duquesne University in 1974.

References

Republican Party members of the Pennsylvania House of Representatives
2021 deaths
1932 births
Politicians from Scranton, Pennsylvania
University of Scranton alumni
Duquesne University alumni
United States Army officers
United States Army personnel of the Vietnam War
Military personnel from Pennsylvania